Julio César Sanders (1897–1942) was an Argentine musician who made his career as a pianist and composer of tango. He was the author of several famous tangos, including Adiós muchachos, composed in 1927 with César Vedani.

Biography 

He was born in Quilmes, Buenos Aires Province, the son of Francisco Alberto Sanders and Paula del Valle, belonging to an Anglo Creole family. He began his career as a pianist of the Argentine radio by the year 1920. His first worked as an author was "La Inglesita", composed in 1924. He was also the author of "Viejo patio", and "El Piano de los recuerdos", with lyrics of Enrique Cadícamo.

His most well-known work Adiós muchachos, was recorded by Carlos Gardel, Ignacio Corsini and Agustín Magaldi. It also was included in Wonder Bar, a 1934 film directed by Lloyd Bacon.

His paternal grandparents were Makinson William Sanders, born in England, and Anne Chartres, a piano teacher born in Ireland. The Sanders's settled with their children in the "English" neighborhood of Quilmes towards the end of the 1880s.

References

External links 
Biografía de Julio César Sanders
Matrimonios 1895–1896

1897 births
1942 deaths
Argentine composers
Argentine pianists
Male pianists
Argentine tango musicians
Musicians from Buenos Aires
People from Buenos Aires
Argentine people of English descent
Argentine people of Irish descent
Argentine people of Spanish descent